MIT Open Learning is an Massachusetts Institute of Technology (MIT) organization, headed by Sanjay Sarma, that oversees several MIT educational initiatives, such as MIT Open CourseWare, MITx, MicroMasters, MIT Bootcamps and others.

MIT Open Learning develops new "to-campus" and "to-job" pathways for learners by combining its credentials (MicroMasters), online programs (MITx) and in-person programs (MIT Bootcamps).

MIT Open Learning is composed of the following programmatic units: 
 MIT Open Courseware 
 MITx MicroMasters
 Abdul Latif Jameel World Education Lab
 MIT Integrated Learning Initiative
 MIT xPro
 MIT Bootcamps

See also 
 edX
 Massive open online course
 MITx
 MIT OpenCourseWare
 Sanjay Sarma

External links 
 MIT Open Learning Official Site
 MIT OpenCourseWare Official Site
 MIT Bootcamps Official Site
 MITx MicroMasters Official Site
 MIT xPro Official Site
 MIT J-WEL Official Site
 MIT Horizon Official Site

References 

Educational technology
Distance education
Massachusetts Institute of Technology